Rutile is an oxide mineral composed of titanium dioxide (TiO2), the most common natural form of TiO2. Rarer polymorphs of TiO2 are known, including anatase, akaogiite, and brookite.

Rutile has one of the highest refractive indices at visible wavelengths of any known crystal and also exhibits a particularly large birefringence and high dispersion. Owing to these properties, it is useful for the manufacture of certain optical elements, especially polarization optics, for longer visible and infrared wavelengths up to about 4.5 micrometres. Natural rutile may contain up to 10% iron and significant amounts of niobium and tantalum.

Rutile derives its name from the Latin  ('red'), in reference to the deep red color observed in some specimens when viewed by transmitted light. Rutile was first described in 1803 by Abraham Gottlob Werner using specimens obtained in Horcajuelo de la Sierra, Madrid (Spain), which is consequently the type locality.

Occurrence

Rutile is a common accessory mineral in high-temperature and high-pressure metamorphic rocks and in igneous rocks.

Thermodynamically, rutile is the most stable polymorph of TiO2 at all temperatures, exhibiting lower total free energy than metastable phases of anatase or brookite. Consequently, the transformation of the metastable TiO2 polymorphs to rutile is irreversible. As it has the lowest molecular volume of the three main polymorphs, it is generally the primary titanium-bearing phase in most high-pressure metamorphic rocks, chiefly eclogites.

Within the igneous environment, rutile is a common accessory mineral in plutonic igneous rocks, though it is also found occasionally in extrusive igneous rocks, particularly those such as kimberlites and lamproites that have deep mantle sources. Anatase and brookite are found in the igneous environment, particularly as products of autogenic alteration during the cooling of plutonic rocks; anatase is also found in placer deposits sourced from primary rutile.

The occurrence of large specimen crystals is most common in pegmatites, skarns, and granite greisens. Rutile is found as an accessory mineral in some altered igneous rocks, and in certain gneisses and schists. In 2005 the Republic of Sierra Leone in West Africa had a production capacity of 23% of the world's annual rutile supply, which rose to approximately 30% in 2008.

Crystal structure

Rutile has a tetragonal unit cell, with unit cell parameters a = b = 4.584 Å, and c = 2.953 Å. The titanium cations have a coordination number of 6, meaning they are surrounded by an octahedron of 6 oxygen atoms. The oxygen anions have a coordination number of 3, resulting in a trigonal planar coordination. Rutile also shows a screw axis when its octahedra are viewed sequentially. When formed under reducing conditions, oxygen vacancies can occur, coupled to Ti3+ centers. Hydrogen can enter these gaps, existing as an individual vacancy occupant (pairing as a hydrogen ion) or creating a hydroxide group with an adjacent oxygen.

Rutile crystals are most commonly observed to exhibit a prismatic or acicular growth habit with preferential orientation along their c axis, the [001] direction. This growth habit is favored as the {110} facets of rutile exhibit the lowest surface free energy and are therefore thermodynamically most stable. The c-axis oriented growth of rutile appears clearly in nanorods, nanowires and abnormal grain growth phenomena of this phase.

Application

In large enough quantities in beach sands, rutile forms an important constituent of heavy minerals and ore deposits. Miners extract and separate the valuable minerals – e.g., rutile, zircon, and ilmenite. The main uses for rutile are the manufacture of refractory ceramic, as a pigment, and for the production of titanium metal.

Finely powdered rutile is a brilliant white pigment and is used in paints, plastics, paper, foods, and other applications that call for a bright white color. Titanium dioxide pigment is the single greatest use of titanium worldwide. Nanoscale particles of rutile are transparent to visible light but are highly effective in the absorption of ultraviolet radiation (sunscreen). The UV absorption of nano-sized rutile particles is blue-shifted compared to bulk rutile so that higher-energy UV light is absorbed by the nanoparticles. Hence, they are used in sunscreens to protect against UV-induced skin damage.

Small rutile needles present in gems are responsible for an optical phenomenon known as asterism. Asteriated gems are known as "star" gems. Star sapphires, star rubies, and other star gems are highly sought after and are generally more valuable than their normal counterparts.

Rutile is widely used as a welding electrode covering. It is also used as a part of the ZTR index, which classifies highly weathered sediments.

Semiconductor 
Rutile, as a large band-gap semiconductor, has in recent decades been the subject of significant research towards applications as a functional oxide for applications in photocatalysis and dilute magnetism. Research efforts typically utilize small quantities of synthetic rutile rather than mineral-deposit derived materials.

Synthetic rutile
Synthetic rutile was first produced in 1948 and is sold under a variety of names. It can be produced from the titanium ore ilmenite through the Becher process. Very pure synthetic rutile is transparent and almost colorless, being slightly yellow, in large pieces. Synthetic rutile can be made in a variety of colors by doping. The high refractive index gives an adamantine luster and strong refraction that leads to a diamond-like appearance. The near-colorless diamond substitute is sold as "Titania", which is the old-fashioned chemical name for this oxide. However, rutile is seldom used in jewellery because it is not very hard (scratch-resistant), measuring only about 6 on the Mohs hardness scale.

As the result of growing research interest in the photocatalytic activity of titanium dioxide, in both anatase and rutile phases (as well as biphasic mixtures of the two phases), rutile TiO2 in powder and thin film form is frequently fabricated in laboratory conditions through solution based routes using inorganic precursors (typically TiCl4) or organometallic precursors (typically alkoxides such as titanium isopropoxide, also known as TTIP). Depending on synthesis conditions, the first phase to crystallize may be the metastable anatase phase, which can then be converted to the equilibrium rutile phase through thermal treatment. The physical properties of rutile are often modified using dopants to impart improved photocatalytic activity through improved photo-generated charge carrier separation, altered electronic band structures and improved surface reactivity.

See also
 List of minerals

References

External links

 

Titanium minerals
Oxide minerals
Rutile group
Tetragonal minerals
Minerals in space group 136